Cathedral Hill may refer to:

 Cathedral Hill, San Francisco
 Cathedral Hill, Saint Paul
 Cathedral Hill, Frombork
 Cathedral Hill Historic District (Baltimore, Maryland), listed on the National Register of Historic Places (NRHP) in Maryland
 Cathedral Hill Historic District (St. Joseph, Missouri), listed on the NRHP in Buchanan County, Missouri
 Cathedral Hill, Lusaka, a neighborhood within the city of Lusaka, the capital of Zambia